John Derek Wrighton MB, BS, FRCS (born 10 March 1933 in Ilford, Essex) is a retired track and field athlete.

Athletics career
He represented Great Britain at the 1960 Summer Olympics in Rome, Italy. He won two gold medals at the 1958 European Championships in Stockholm, Sweden: in the men's individual 400 metres and in the 4x400 metres relay, alongside Ted Sampson, John MacIsaac, and John Salisbury. Known for both his pronounced lean when running and his erratic pacing, John Wrighton and John Salisbury marked the beginning of the renaissance of British quarter miling after the second World War.

He represented England and won a silver medal in the 4 x 440 yards relay at the 1958 British Empire and Commonwealth Games in Cardiff, Wales.

Personal life
From 1958, Wrighton served on a short-service commission with the Royal Navy, achieving the rank of Surgeon Lieutenant, after which he was placed on the emergency list and retired in May 1961. He then completed his medical training becoming FRCS in 1967 and made his home in Dorset where he worked for many years as an orthopaedic surgeon.

Wrighton was awarded an honorary Doctor of Science degree by the University of Bournemouth in 2007. Wrighton served on the board of the university for seven years.

References

External links
 
 Wrighton awarded doctorate by Bournemouth University
 

1933 births
Living people
People from Ilford
British male sprinters
English male sprinters
Olympic athletes of Great Britain
Athletes (track and field) at the 1960 Summer Olympics
European Athletics Championships medalists
People educated at East Barnet School
Athletes (track and field) at the 1958 British Empire and Commonwealth Games
Commonwealth Games medallists in athletics
Commonwealth Games silver medallists for England
20th-century Royal Navy personnel
Fellows of the Royal College of Surgeons
British orthopaedic surgeons
Medallists at the 1958 British Empire and Commonwealth Games